Dick Tracy (1937) is a 15-chapter Republic movie serial starring Ralph Byrd based on the Dick Tracy comic strip by Chester Gould. It was directed by Alan James and Ray Taylor.

Plot
Dick Tracy's foe for this serial is the crime boss and masked mystery villain the Spider/the Lame One (both names are used) and his Spider Ring. In the process of various crimes, including using his flying wing and sound weapon to destroy the Bay Bridge in San Francisco and stealing an experimental "speed plane", The Spider captures Dick Tracy's brother, Gordon. The Spider's minion, Dr. Moloch, performs a brain operation on Gordon Tracy to turn him evil, making him secretly part of the Spider Ring and so turning brother against brother.

Cast

Starring cast
Ralph Byrd as Dick Tracy
Kay Hughes as Gwen Andrews
Smiley Burnette as Mike McGurk
Lee Van Atta as Junior
John Picorri as Dr Moloch
Richard Beach as Gordon Tracy (pre-operation in Chapter 1)
Carleton Young as Gordon Tracy (post-operation in Chapter 1)
Fred Hamilton as Steve Lockwood
Francis X. Bushman as Clive Anderson

The above cast members appear in the opening credits in "cameo" display — sequential pictures of each actor with his/her name (and sometimes character name) superimposed at the bottom of the screen — for the first episode, followed by a listing of supporting players. Subsequent chapters simply listed the stars on one screen and the same supporting cast a second. This approach to cast display was used by Republic from its first serial through Haunted Harbor in 1944. Universal serials presented a similar approach to cast display until 1940, only in their case, the star-cameos appeared with the first 3-4 episodes, and subsequent episodes listed these names usually followed, on a scrolling cast list, by part, but not often all, of the supporting players who had been named on the episodes with the cameos. Occasionally, a new player or two might be added. Columbia only a few times adopted this approach to displaying the cast of its serials. Republic, Universal, Warner Bros. Pictures, and some independents also used star "cameos" in numbers of their B pictures during the 1930s.

Supporting cast
John Dilson as Ellery Brewster
Wedgwood Nowell as H. T. Clayton
Theodore Lorch as Paterno
Edwin Stanley as Walter Odette 
Harrison Greene as Cloggerstein
Herbert Weber as Tony Martino
Buddy Roosevelt as Burke
George DeNormand as Flynn
Byron K. Foulger as Kovitch

The above cast members appear in the opening credits as simply a list of the actor's names.

Production
Dick Tracy was budgeted at $112,334 although the final negative cost was $127,640 (a $15,306, or 13.6%, overspend).  It was the most expensive Republic serial until S O S Coast Guard was released later in the year.

It was filmed between 30 November and 24 December 1936 under the working titles Adventures of Dick Tracy and The Spider Ring.  The serial's production number was 420.

In this serial, Dick Tracy is a G-Man (FBI) in San Francisco rather than a Midwestern city police detective as in the comic strip. Most of the Dick Tracy supporting cast and rogues gallery were also dropped and new, original characters used instead (for instance the characters of Tracy's girlfriend Gwen Andrews and his detective partner Mike McGurk were stand-ins for Tess Trueheart and Pat Patton respectively). Dick Tracy creator Chester Gould approved the script despite these changes.

There were three sequels to this serial: Dick Tracy Returns (1938), Dick Tracy's G-Men (1939), and Dick Tracy vs. Crime, Inc. (1941). They were all permitted by an interpretation of the original contract, which allowed a "series or serial". That meant that Dick Tracys creator, Chester Gould, was only paid for the rights to produce this serial but not for any of the sequels.

Stunts
George DeNormand as Dick Tracy (doubling Ralph Byrd)
Loren Riebe (doubling Jack Gardner)

Special effects
John T. Coyle
The Lydecker brothers

Release

Theatrical
Dick Tracy'''s official release date is 20 February 1937, although this is actually the date the seventh chapter was made available to film exchanges.

Alpha Video released the serial on two DVDs in 2003. Volume 1 contains Chapters 1 through 7, and Volume 2 contains Chapters 8 through 15.  VCI released all four Dick Tracy serials on DVD in 2008 separately, then put them all out together in one boxed set in 2012.

A 73-minute feature film version, created by editing the serial footage together, was reported by Jack Mathis to have been released on 27 December 1937, based on a single memo in the Republic Pictures corporate papers files; however, no evidence of any showing of this film, at least within the United States, has ever been located, nor any other evidence that such a feature version was even made.
The only known feature version of this serial is a direct-to-TV movie edited and syndicated in the late 1980s, and subsequently made available on videotape and DVD (most recently, under the altered title Dick Tracy and the Spider Gang).

Critical reception
Cline states that the Dick Tracy serials were "unexcelled in the action field," adding that "in any listing of serials released after 1930, the four Dick Tracy adventures from Republic must stand out as classics of the suspense detective thrillers, and the models for many others to follow."  He goes on to write that Ralph Byrd "played the part [of Dick Tracy] to the hilt, giving his portrayal such unbridled, exuberant enthusiasm that the resulting excitement was contagious."  Byrd become identified with the character following the release of this serial.  The final chapter reunion between Dick and Gordon Tracy, as Gordon lies dying and his memory returns, is "one of the few moments of real emotional drama ever attempted in serials". This added to the human quality of Dick Tracy, which was present in both this serial and Chester Gould's original strip.

Chapter titles
The Spider Strikes (29 min 31s)The Bridge of Terror (19 min 11s)The Fur Pirates (20 min 25s)Death Rides the Sky (20 min 49s)Brother Against Brother (19 min 14s)Dangerous Waters (16 min 52s)The Ghost Town Mystery (20 min 11s)Battle in the Clouds (18 min 40s)The Stratosphere Adventure (18 min 00s)The Gold Ship (18 min 28s)Harbor Pursuit (16 min 35s)The Trail of the Spider (17 min 39s) — re-cap chapter
The Fire Trap (16 min 45s)The Devil in White (20 min 35s)Brothers United (16 min 59s)Source:Dick Tracy was the only 15-chapter serial released by Republic in 1937.

CliffhangersThe Spider Strikes:  The Bay Bridge, under attack from the Spider's sonic weapon, begins to collapse on top of Dick Tracy.The Bridge of Terror: Dick Tracy's plane is damaged by gunfire and crashes into a rail bridge.The Fur Pirates: Chasing his brother and the Spider Ring by motorboat, Dick Tracy is crushed between two moored ships moving closer together.Death Rides the Sky: Dick Tracy transfers to an unmanned, remote plane to save Junior but it is shot down by the Spider Ring.Brother Against Brother: In a roof-top chase, Gordon shoots his brother Dick, sending him into a multi-story fall.Dangerous Waters: Dick Tracy's leg is caught in submarine's mooring line, pulling him under the waves.The Ghost Town Mystery: Dick Tracy falls into a pit in a mine tunnel. Spider Ring thugs take aim.Battle in the Clouds: Gordon shoots down his brother's plane.The Stratosphere Adventure: Dick Tracy is knocked unconscious aboard a burning, crashing Zeppelin.The Gold Ship: A steel plate from a ship's hull falls on top of Dick Tracy.Harbour Pursuit: Dick Tracy's motorboat has its controls shot out by thugs, crashing into an oncoming ship.The Trail of the Spider: The lights go out, the Spider mark shines on Dick Tracy's forehead, several shots are fired.The Fire Trap:  Dick Tracy falls while escaping a burning ship.The Devil in White: Dick Tracy is strapped to an operating table to undergo the same brain operation as his brother Gordon.

References in other films
 The cliffhanger for chapter three, a motorboat chase, is copied in the movie Indiana Jones and the Last Crusade (1989).
 The Spider's flying wing was reused for the later, unconnected, Republic serial The Fighting Devil Dogs'' (1938).

References

External links

 
 
 
 Dick Tracy at Todd Gault's Movie Serial Experience

Download or view online
 Download or view the complete public domain serial at The Internet Archive

 
 
 
 
 
 
 
 
 
 
 
 
 
 
 

 View the complete public domain serial in Flash video format

1937 films
1930s crime films
American black-and-white films
Dick Tracy films
1930s English-language films
Republic Pictures film serials
Films directed by Ray Taylor
Films directed by Alan James
American aviation films
Articles containing video clips
Films produced by Nat Levine
1930s American films